Middle Gorge railway station is located on the Mernda line in Victoria, Australia. It serves the north-eastern Melbourne suburb of South Morang, and it opened on 26 August 2018.

History

Middle Gorge station opened on 26 August 2018, when the line was extended from South Morang to Mernda, as part of the Mernda Rail project. It was first announced as one of two new stations for the project, which was an extension of the South Morang line along the former Whittlesea line right-of-way. Hawkstowe was added to the project after community pressure.

The station was originally to be named "Marymede", after the nearby Marymede Catholic College. However, this went against Victorian place-naming conventions, as it was named after a school. This caused public outrage for many reasons, mainly because its namesake Middle Gorge Park is located over 2 km from the station site. A letter sent from residents to the Victorian Government states that there was no consultation in the naming process, and that it does not accurately represent the station's location. Residents believe the station should be called "South Morang", whilst the current South Morang station be renamed to "Plenty Valley", in order to better reflect their locations. Middle Gorge is near the approximate site of the original South Morang station.

It is the only station between South Morang and Mernda that is not elevated. It is also the only station between Thomastown and Mernda that does not have an island platform.

Platforms and services

Middle Gorge has two side platforms. It is serviced by Metro Trains' Mernda line services.

Platform 1:
  all stations and limited express services to Flinders Street

Platform 2:
  all stations services to Mernda

Transport links

Dysons operates one route via Middle Gorge station, under contract to Public Transport Victoria:
 : Mill Park Lakes Palisades Estate – University Hill

Gallery

References

External links

Railway stations in Melbourne
Railway stations in Australia opened in 2018
Railway stations in the City of Whittlesea